A letter of wishes is a tool used by someone setting up a trust, to pass along information to the trustees. A letter of wishes usually contains instructions or extra information for the trustees. The trustees are not legally bound to follow a letter of wishes, but it is guidance that they must take into account and in practice it is usually followed. It is mainly used because it is easy to change, unlike amending a will or trust deed, and will remain private among the trustees.

References

Wills and trusts
Equity (law)
Property law
Inheritance